Shadman (also Romanized as Shādmān) is a village in Dasturan Rural District, in the Central District of Joghatai County, Razavi Khorasan Province, Iran. At the 2006 census, its population was 77, in 22 families.

References 

Populated places in Joghatai County